Chrysoesthia candidella is a moth of the family Gelechiidae. It is found in Tunisia.

The wingspan is about 13 mm. The forewings are white, with black scales forming a triangular at the costa. The hindwings are yellowish-white.

References

Moths described in 1915
Chrysoesthia